Chan Seyha (born 9 August 1994 in Phnom Penh, Cambodia) is a Cambodian runner who competed in the 200 metre event at the 2011 World Championships in Athletics and also she competed at the 2012 Summer Olympics in the 200 m event but was eliminated in the first round.

References

External links
 

1994 births
Living people
Sportspeople from Phnom Penh
Cambodian female sprinters
Olympic athletes of Cambodia
Athletes (track and field) at the 2012 Summer Olympics
Athletes (track and field) at the 2018 Asian Games
Asian Games competitors for Cambodia
Olympic female sprinters